George Andrew Hendrick Jr. (born October 18, 1949) is an American former professional baseball player and coach.

He also played for the Cleveland Indians, San Diego Padres and the Pittsburgh Pirates. Hendrick is currently the special advisor to baseball operations for the Tampa Bay Rays.

Playing career

Over 18 seasons, Hendrick posted a .278 batting average with 267 home runs and 1,111 RBI. His career stats included 941 runs, 1,980 hits, 343 doubles, 59 stolen bases, 567 walks, .329 on-base percentage and a .446 slugging percentage in 7,129 at-bats. Playing at all three outfield positions and first base, he compiled a .987 fielding percentage.

Hendrick began his baseball career in the minor leagues with Burlington in 1968, leading the league with a .327 batting average and 25 doubles.  He was an all-star four times—twice with Cleveland in 1974 and 1975 and twice with St. Louis in 1980 and 1983—and he finished in the top 15 in league MVP voting four consecutive years between 1980 and 1983.  Hendrick was one of the first players to hit 100 home runs in each league—150 for the National League and 117 for the American League. He was the first MLB player to wear his pant legs down to his ankles. He was nicknamed "Jogging George" and "Captain Easy" because of his reputation for not running plays out or giving 100% effort and "Silent George" because of his longstanding policy of not talking to the media.

Angels beat reporter Lisa Nehus Saxon, one of the first women to cover an MLB team, credited Hendrick for protecting her from Reggie Jackson's harassment and verbal abuse.

Hendrick played winter ball with the Cangrejeros de Santurce club of the Puerto Rico League, where he won the batting title in the 1973−1974 tournament. He also played for the Gold Coast Suns of the Senior Professional Baseball Association in its 1989 inaugural season.

Transactions involving Hendrick
On March 24, 1973, the Oakland A's traded Hendrick, with catcher Dave Duncan, to the Cleveland Indians for catcher Ray Fosse and shortstop Jack Heidemann.
On December 8, 1976, the Indians traded him to the San Diego Padres for outfielder John Grubb, catcher Fred Kendall, and infielder Héctor Torres.
On May 26, 1978, the Padres traded Hendrick to the St. Louis Cardinals for pitcher Eric Rasmussen.
On December 12, 1984, the Cardinals traded him, with catcher Steve Barnard, to the Pittsburgh Pirates for pitcher John Tudor and outfielder Brian Harper.
On August 2, 1985, the Pirates traded Hendrick, along with John Candelaria and Al Holland, to the California Angels for Pat Clements, Mike Brown and a player to be named later (Bob Kipper).

Coaching career
Hendrick began his coaching career with the Cardinals as a minor league hitting/outfield instructor from 1993 to 1995 before becoming the hitting coach of the big league club from 1996 to 1997. After leaving the Cardinals, he worked as coach at various levels in the California Angels and Los Angeles Dodgers systems from 1998 to 2005. On November 21, 2005, Hendrick was named as a first base/outfield coach for Tampa Bay, a position he held through the end of the 2014 season. He then became Special Advisor to Baseball Operations for the Rays.

Personal life
His son, Brian, played college basketball for the California Golden Bears.

See also

 List of Major League Baseball career home run leaders
 List of Major League Baseball career runs batted in leaders
 List of St. Louis Cardinals team records
 List of St. Louis Cardinals coaches

References

External links

1949 births
Living people
African-American baseball coaches
African-American baseball players
American League All-Stars
Anaheim Angels coaches
Baseball players from Los Angeles
Birmingham A's players
Burlington Bees players
California Angels players
Cangrejeros de Santurce (baseball) players
Cleveland Indians players
Gold Coast Suns (baseball) players
Iowa Oaks players
John C. Fremont High School alumni
Liga de Béisbol Profesional Roberto Clemente outfielders
Lodi Crushers players
Los Angeles Dodgers coaches
Major League Baseball center fielders
Major League Baseball first base coaches
Major League Baseball hitting coaches
Major League Baseball right fielders
Minor league baseball managers
National League All-Stars
Oakland Athletics players
Pittsburgh Pirates players
San Diego Padres players
Silver Slugger Award winners
St. Louis Cardinals coaches
St. Louis Cardinals players
Tampa Bay Devil Rays coaches
Tampa Bay Rays coaches
21st-century African-American people
20th-century African-American sportspeople